An Adventure in Space and Time is a 2013 British biographical television film, starring David Bradley, Brian Cox, Jessica Raine and Sacha Dhawan. Directed by Terry McDonough, and written by regular Doctor Who writer Mark Gatiss, it premiered on BBC Two on 21 November 2013, to coincide with the 50th anniversary of the science fiction television series. Further, international broadcasts of the television film were made after its premiere on British television.

The biographical film focuses on a dramatised version of events surrounding the creation of Doctor Who in the 1960s, with emphasis on actor William Hartnell, portrayed by Bradley, as he took on the role of the original incarnation of the show's main character, the Doctor. Alongside Hartnell, the story also focused on the behind-the-scene events with the production staff, including the involvement of Sydney Newman, Verity Lambert and Waris Hussein. The television film received positive feedback after its broadcast and received a number of award nominations. Following his role in the film, Bradley would take part in Doctor Who in the role of the First Doctor, for the 2017 episodes "The Doctor Falls" and "Twice Upon a Time", and the 2022 special "The Power of the Doctor", as well as for a series of audio adventures for Big Finish Productions.

Synopsis
In 1963, Sydney Newman (Brian Cox) becomes the BBC's new Head of Drama. To plug a gap between the broadcasts of Grandstand and Juke Box Jury, he devises a new science-fiction series, to be entitled "Doctor Who", which will cater to children and adults alike, and feature a central character who is an old man and a "doctor". Newman recruits Verity Lambert (Jessica Raine) to head the programme as producer, despite the difficulties she faces from others in her new role. Lambert and Waris Hussein (Sacha Dhawan), the programme's director, recruit William Hartnell (David Bradley) for the role of The Doctor, despite some trepidation from him over how it will aid his acting career.

After Lambert strengthens her assertiveness and secures a set piece for the programme that resembles the interior of the TARDIS. Production of the pilot episode An Unearthly Child is beset by difficulties. Newman dislikes the end results and orders a re-shoot, including a request for Hartnell's character to be gentler and kinder on screen. Lambert and Hussein manage to complete the re-shoot in time for the pilot to be broadcast on its scheduled transmission date. Upon learning that the programme is to be cancelled, due to the diminished audience the pilot episode received in the wake of the assassination of John F. Kennedy, Lambert successfully appeals to Newman for it to be broadcast again before the second episode is transmitted. Although Newman reluctantly goes against his belief not to include monsters into Doctor Who, by agreeing to let Lambert introduce creatures called the Daleks into the next serial, he admits he was mistaken upon seeing the strong viewing figures.

Meanwhile, Hartnell takes delight in his role, becoming attached to his character and the popularity it brings him with children. However, as the programme progresses, and both cast and crew change over time, Hartnell's health begins to decline. Concerned over his failure to properly remember his lines, Newman agrees to his superior's request to replace Hartnell for a new actor, Patrick Troughton (Reece Shearsmith), for the next series. With a heavy heart, Hartnell agrees to leave, but emotionally breaks down upon telling his wife the news. As Hartnell prepares for his final scene in 1966, recalling how Doctor Who began and his involvement with it, he commends Troughton for being his successor before his first scene is filmed. As filming begins, Hartnell looks to the side and sees a brief vision of Matt Smith, who will play the same role nearly 50 years later, silently acknowledge his work.

The film ends on an epilogue narrative of each of the main real-life figures in the story, before closing on the real Hartnell's speech made at the end of the serial The Dalek Invasion of Earth.

Production

Development 
For the thirtieth anniversary of Doctor Who in 1993, filmmaker Kevin Davies pitched an idea called The Legend Begins to the BBC. The Legend Begins would have mixed documentary interviews with those responsible for the creation of Doctor Who with a dramatised strand showing the programme's beginnings. Eventually, the dramatisation idea was abandoned in favour of a standard documentary format looking at the entire history of Doctor Who, which was broadcast on BBC1 as Doctor Who: Thirty Years in the TARDIS in November 1993. Ten years later, for the fortieth anniversary, writer and executive producer Mark Gatiss pitched the idea for the film to BBC Four, unaware of Davies's previous attempt. However, the proposal was rejected, and Gatiss was told that there was no available slot or budget.

Writing 
In order to make the film comprehensible among a general audience, not all personnel involved in the creation of Doctor Who are represented. For example, the role of original story editor David Whitaker is merged with that of associate producer Mervyn Pinfield; co-creator Donald Wilson and writer C.E. Webber are also excluded.

Part of the production involved the recreation of scenes from the classic series, including missing episodes such as Marco Polo. Gatiss also had ambitions to recreate the death of Sara Kingdom from The Daleks' Master Plan using original actress Jean Marsh to play the increasingly aging Sara, and to use Super 8 footage of a recreation of the Radio Times publicity photo-shoot for The Three Doctors, with himself as Jon Pertwee, but the budget did not accommodate these ambitions.

Filming 
Principal photography for the film began in February 2013. Filming primarily took place at Wimbledon Studios in London, and the BBC Television Centre; it was the final drama to be recorded at the latter, which closed one month after filming concluded.

Location filming took place on 17 February 2013, on Westminster Bridge in London. This involved replicas of 1960s Dalek props crossing the bridge, in a recreation of a famous scene from The Dalek Invasion of Earth (1964). Interior scenes replicating early Doctor Who production at Lime Grove Studios were also filmed, with replicas of early television equipment being used.

Cast
A number of the cast have appeared in Doctor Who at one time or another, most notably original companions William Russell and Carole Ann Ford. David Bradley appeared in the Series 7 episode "Dinosaurs on a Spaceship", while Jessica Raine was in the Series 7 episode "Hide" and the Call the Midwife charity cross-over mini-episode; Jeff Rawle was in the Season 21 serial Frontios; Mark Eden appeared as the title character in the Season 1 serial Marco Polo; Nicholas Briggs, who has voiced the Daleks since the series was revived in 2005, portrayed his own predecessor; and Brian Cox voiced the Elder Ood in "The End of Time". Jean Marsh and Anneke Wills, who both played companions to Hartnell's First Doctor also appeared during Verity Lambert's leaving party scene, while William Russell appeared as security guard Harry. Sacha Dhawan would go on to play the Master starting with the Series 12 episode "Spyfall", while Bradley would re-don the First Doctor costume to play the part himself in the 2017 Christmas episode, "Twice Upon a Time". Bradley also appeared as the Doctor in a series of audio adventures produced by Big Finish Productions alongside Jamie Glover, Jemma Powell and Claudia Grant as Ian, Barbara and Susan.

Doctor Who actors
 David Bradley as William Hartnell, who portrayed the First Doctor
 Jamie Glover as William Russell, who portrayed Ian Chesterton
 Jemma Powell as Jacqueline Hill, who portrayed Barbara Wright
 Claudia Grant as Carole Ann Ford, who portrayed Susan Foreman
 Anna-Lisa Drew as Maureen O'Brien, who portrayed Vicki
 Edmund C. Short as Peter Purves, who portrayed Steven Taylor
 Sophie Holt as Jackie Lane, who portrayed Dodo Chaplet
 Robin Varley as Michael Craze, who portrayed Ben Jackson
 Ellie Spicer as Anneke Wills, who portrayed Polly
 Reece Shearsmith as Patrick Troughton, who portrayed the Second Doctor
 Nicholas Briggs as Peter Hawkins, original voice of the Daleks and Cybermen

Behind-the-scenes personnel
 Brian Cox as Sydney Newman, creator
 Jessica Raine as Verity Lambert, original producer
 Sacha Dhawan as Waris Hussein, original director
 Sarah Winter as Delia Derbyshire, producer of composer Ron Grainer's theme tune recording
 Joseph Railton as Brian Hodgson, creator of sound effects
 Jeff Rawle as Mervyn Pinfield, associate producer
 Andrew Woodall as Rex Tucker, director
 Ian Hallard as Richard Martin, director
 David Annen as Peter Brachacki, original production designer
 Sam Hoare as Douglas Camfield, production assistant
 Mark Eden as Donald Baverstock, controller of BBC1

Others
 Lesley Manville as Heather Hartnell, wife of William Hartnell
 Cara Jenkins as Judith "Jessica" Carney, granddaughter of William Hartnell
 William Russell as Harry
 Carole Ann Ford as Joyce
 Ross Gurney-Randall as Reg
 Reece Pockney as Alan
 Charlie Kemp as Arthur
 Roger May as Len
 Kit Connor as Charlie
 Matt Smith as himself (uncredited cameo)
 Jean Marsh (uncredited cameo)
 Anneke Wills (uncredited cameo)
 Donald Tosh (uncredited cameo)
 Toby Hadoke as the Bartender

Reception

Ratings and reviews
The drama was watched by 2.71 million viewers in the UK. Rotten Tomatoes gave it a 95% approval rating based on 22 reviews, and an average score of 8.5/10. The website's critics consensus reads "Fun, clever, and eminently accessible, An Adventure in Space and Time offers entertaining viewing for Doctor Who newcomers and diehards alike." On Metacritic, it holds a weighted average score of 77 out of 100, based on 11 reviews, indicating "generally favorable reviews."

Awards and nominations
On Monday 24 March 2014, An Adventure in Space and Time was nominated for three BAFTA Craft Awards; Suzanne Cave for 'Best Costume Design', Philip Kloss for 'Editing - Fiction' and Vickie Lang for 'Make Up and Hair Design'.  Lang was successful in her category, with Gemma Chan presenting her the award on Sunday 17 April 2014. Speaking to Jenni Falconer, she described how she 'absolutely loved the project, [and that] it was a hair and make up artist's dream.' 

Further nominations for the production from the BAFTA Awards for 'Best Single Drama' and the Hugo Awards for 'Best Dramatic Presentation, Short Form' were received on Monday 7th and Saturday 19 April 2014.  The BAFTA Award was won by Channel 4's Complicit at the ceremony on 18 May.
The winner of the Hugo Award was announced on Sunday 17 August 2014.  The award went to the Game of Thrones episode "The Rains of Castamere".

Home media
An Adventure in Space and Time was released on DVD in Region 2 on 2 December 2013. Special features included Scene Recreations, Deleted Scenes, and a Making of documentary, narrated by Carole Ann Ford. A three-disc Blu-ray set was released in North America on 27 May 2014. The set includes the feature on Blu-ray, DVD and An Unearthly Child on DVD. The special was re-released on DVD and Blu-ray on 8 September 2014 as part of a "50th Anniversary Collectors Boxset" alongside "The Name of the Doctor", "The Night of the Doctor", "The Day of the Doctor", "The Time of the Doctor" and "The Five(ish) Doctors Reboot".

Soundtrack release
Edmund Butt's score was released by Silva Screen Records 3 March 2014.

Track listing

References

External links

 
 

2013 in British television
2013 television films
2013 films
2014 soundtrack albums
BBC television dramas
British television films
Films about television
Films set in 1963
Films set in 1964
Films set in 1965
Films set in 1966
Films set in London
Works by Mark Gatiss
Works about Doctor Who
Films about actors